Prudenville is an unincorporated community and census-designated place (CDP) in Roscommon County in the U.S. state of Michigan.  The population was 1,643 at the 2020 census.  Prudenville is located within Denton Township.

History

The area received its first post office on September 6, 1875 under the name Prudenville, and it was soon changed to the name Edna on January 10, 1876.  The name Edna existed until it was changed back to Prudenville on January 14, 1886.  The Prudenville post office was discontinued on August 15, 1911, but reestablished 10 years later on August 30, 1921.  The post office remains in operation and is located at 899 West Houghton Lake Drive (M-55).

The Homestead Act of 1862, which granted free land to travelers moving west, prompted settlers to the Prudenville area in 1870 due to its plentiful lumber resources.  The growing community was named after early developer Peter Pruden, and the community grew to include a post office, two hotels, many businesses, and a school.  In 1882, the Roscommon Lumber Company built a "stand-alone" trestle railroad to assist logging crews in pushing timber into the east bay of Houghton Lake.  The logs were floated across the lake into the draining Muskegon River and further down the river to the mills of Muskegon on the shores of Lake Michigan.  During its operation from 1882 to 1887, the company employed 700 workers and logged 175 million board feet of white and Norway pine.

In 2004, the Roscommon Lumber Company and the community of Prudenville were dually listed as a Michigan State Historic Site.  A historic marker was dedicated in Trestle Park on September 6, 2014.

Geography

Prudenville has its own post office with the 48651 ZIP Code.  The Prudenville post office serves most of Denton Township and smaller portions of Roscommon Township to the south, Nester Township to the southwest, and Backus Township and Higgins Township to the northeast.  Prudenville is an unincorporated community listed by the U.S. Census Bureau as a census-designated place (CDP) for statistical purposes only, and the community itself has no legal autonomy as an incorporated municipality.  The western portion of the Prudenville CDP also includes a small portion of the Houghton Lake 48629 ZIP Code.

Prudenville is considered part of the Northern Michigan region.  It is located on the southeast shores of Houghton Lake, which is the state's largest inland lake.  Portions of the Au Sable State Forest (Roscommon State Forest Management Unit) and Backus Creek State Game Area are within close proximity.

Major highways
 is known locally as S. Gladwin Road; briefly runs concurrent with M-55 before continuing north as E. Houghton Lake Drive
 is known locally as W. Houghton Lake Drive and then exiting under the name W. West Branch Road
, located just east of the boundaries of the Prudenville CDP

Demographics

As of the census of 2000, there were 1,737 people, 818 households, and 542 families residing in the CDP. The racial makeup of the CDP was 98.39% White, 0.12% African American, 0.69% Native American, 0.12% Asian, 0.06% from other races, and 0.63% from two or more races. Hispanic or Latino of any race were 0.52% of the population.

There were 819 households, out of which 18.2% had children under the age of 18 living with them, 55.3% were married couples living together, 7.6% had a female householder with no husband present, and 33.7% were non-families. 30.1% of all households were made up of individuals, and 16.9% had someone living alone who was 65 years of age or older.  The average household size was 2.12 and the average family size was 2.58.

In the CDP, the population was spread out, with 17.6% under the age of 18, 5.2% from 18 to 24, 18.9% from 25 to 44, 29.5% from 45 to 64, and 28.8% who were 65 years of age or older.  The median age was 52 years. For every 100 females, there were 89.6 males.  For every 100 females age 18 and over, there were 84.1 males.

The median income for a household in the CDP was $29,821, and the median income for a family was $36,313. Males had a median income of $34,135 versus $20,625 for females. The per capita income for the CDP was $19,018.  About 9.4% of families and 11.6% of the population were below the poverty line, including 25.4% of those under age 18 and 6.1% of those age 65 or over.

References

Unincorporated communities in Roscommon County, Michigan
Unincorporated communities in Michigan
Census-designated places in Michigan
Census-designated places in Roscommon County, Michigan
Michigan State Historic Sites
Populated places established in 1875
1875 establishments in Michigan